Sansa may refer to:

Arts, entertainment, and media
 Sansa (film), 2003 French film
 Sansa Stark, a fictional character from A Song of Ice and Fire book series, and the adaptation, Game of Thrones

Brands and enterprises
 Sansa Airlines (Servicios Aéreos Nacionales S.A.), an airline based in San José, Costa Rica
 SanDisk portable media players, now known as SanDisk Clip, formerly Sansa

People
 Honinbo Sansa, a Buddhist priest
 Maya Sansa, an Italian actress

Other uses
 Sansa (temple), Korean Buddhist temples
 Sansa, a mbira or "thumb piano"
 Sansa, Pyrénées-Orientales, a commune in France
 Sansa, Turkey, a village in Üzümlü District in Turkey
 Sansa apple, a dessert apple, cross of the Japanese Akane and New Zealand Gala varietals
 South African National Space Agency, or SANSA